Robinia pseudoacacia, commonly known in its native territory as black locust, is a medium-sized hardwood deciduous tree, belonging to the tribe Robinieae of the legume family Fabaceae. It is endemic to a few small areas of the United States, but it has been widely planted and naturalized elsewhere in temperate North America, Europe, Southern Africa and Asia and is considered an invasive species in some areas. Another common name is false acacia, a literal translation of the specific name (pseudo [Greek ψευδο-] meaning fake or false and acacia referring to the genus of plants with the same name).

Description 
It is a very upright tree with a straight trunk and narrow crown that grows scraggly with age. The dark blue-green compound leaves with a contrasting lighter underside give this tree a beautiful appearance in the wind and contribute to its grace.

Black locust is a shade-intolerant species and therefore is typical of young woodlands and disturbed areas where sunlight is plentiful and the soil is dry. In this sense, black locust can be considered a weed tree. It also spreads by underground shoots or suckers, which contributes to the weedy character of this species. Young trees are often spiny, but mature trees often lack spines. In the early summer black locust flowers; the flowers are large and appear in large, intensely fragrant clusters reminiscent of orange blossoms. The leaflets fold together in wet weather and at night (nyctinasty), as some change of position at night is a habit of the entire leguminous family.

Although similar in general appearance to the honey locust, the black locust lacks that tree's characteristic long branched thorns on the trunk, having instead pairs of short prickles at the base of each leaf; the leaflets are also much broader than honey locust. It may resemble Styphnolobium japonicum, which has smaller flower spikes and lacks spines.

Detailed description 

The bark is a reddish black and gray and tinged with red or orange in the grooves. It is deeply furrowed into grooves and ridges which run up and down the trunk and often cross and form diamond shapes.
The roots of black locust contain nodules that allow it to fix nitrogen, as is common within the pea family.
The branches are typically zig-zaggy and may have ridges and grooves or may be round. When young, they are at first coated with white silvery down; this soon disappears, and they become pale green and afterward reddish or greenish brown.
Spines may or may not be present on young trees, root suckers, and branches near the ground; typically, branches high above the ground rarely contain spines. R. pseudoacacia is quite variable in the number of spines present, as some trees are densely prickly and other trees have no prickles at all. The spines typically remain on the tree until the young thin bark to which they are attached is replaced by the thicker mature bark. They develop from stipules (small leaf-like structures that grow at the base of leaves), and since stipules are paired at the base of leaves, the spines will be paired at the bases of leaves. Their color is of a dark purple and they adhere only to the bark.
Wood is pale yellowish brown, heavy, hard, strong, close-grained, and very durable in contact with the ground. The wood has a specific gravity of 0.733 (733 kilograms per cubic metre or 45.7 pounds per cubic foot).
The leaves are compound, meaning that each leaf contains many smaller leaf like structures called leaflets, which are roughly paired on either side of the stem that runs through the leaf (rachis). There is typically one leaflet at the tip of the leaf (odd pinnate), and the leaves are alternately arranged on the stem. The leaflets are rounded or slightly indented at the tip and typically rounded at the base. The leaves come out of the bud folded in half, yellow green, covered with silvery down which soon disappears. Each leaflet initially has a minute stipel, which quickly falls, and is connected to the (rachis) by a short stem or petiolule. The leaves are attached to the branch with slender hairy petioles which are grooved and swollen at the base. The stipules are linear, downy, membranous at first and occasionally develop into prickles. The leaves appear relatively late in spring.
The leaf color of the fully grown leaves is a dull dark green above and paler beneath. In autumn. the leaves turn a clear pale yellow.

The flowers open in May or June for 7–10 days, after the leaves have developed. The flowers themselves are cream-white (rarely pink or purple) with a pale yellow blotch in the center and imperfectly papilionaceous in shape. Each flower is perfect, having both stamens and a pistil (male and female parts). There are 10 stamens enclosed within the petals; these are fused together in a diadelphous configuration, where the filaments of 9 are all joined to form a tube and one stamen is separate and above the joined stamens. The single ovary is superior and contains several ovules. Below each flower is a calyx which looks like leafy tube between the flower and the stem. It is made from fused sepals and is dark green and may be blotched with red. The pedicels (stems which connect the flower to the branch) are slender, dark red or reddish green.
The fruit usually contains 4–8 seeds. The seeds are dark orange brown with irregular markings. They ripen late in autumn and hang on the branches until early spring. There are typically 25,500 seeds per pound.
Winter buds: Minute, naked (having no scales covering them), three or four together, protected in a depression by a scale-like covering lined on the inner surface with a thick coat of tomentum and opening in early spring.  When the buds are forming they are covered by the swollen base of the petiole.
Cotyledons are oval in shape and fleshy.

Reproduction and dispersal 
Black locust reproduces both sexually via flowers, and asexually via root suckers. The flowers are pollinated by insects, primarily by Hymenopteran insects. The physical construction of the flower separates the male and female parts so that self-pollination will not typically occur. The seedlings grow rapidly but they have a thick seed coat which means that not all seeds will germinate. The seed coat can be weakened via hot water, sulfuric acid, or be mechanically scarified, which will allow a greater quantity of the seeds to grow. The seeds are produced in good crops every year or every other year.

Root suckers are an important method of local reproduction of this tree. The roots may grow suckers after damage (by being hit with a lawn mower or otherwise damaged) or after no damage at all.  The suckers are stems which grow from the roots, directly into the air and may grow into full trees. The main trunk also has the capability to grow sprouts and will do so after being cut down. This makes removal of black locust difficult as the suckers need to be continually removed from both the trunk and roots or the tree will regrow. This is considered an asexual form of reproduction.

The suckers allow black locust to grow into colonies which often exclude other species. These colonies may form dense thickets which shade out competition.
Black locust has been found to have either 2n=20 or 2n=22 chromosomes.

Flavonoids content 
Black locust leaves contain flavone glycosides characterised by spectroscopic and chemical methods as the 7-O-β-ᴅ-glucuronopyranosyl-(1→2)[α-ʟ-rhamnopyranosyl-(1→6)]-β-ᴅ-glucopyranosides of acacetin (5,7-dihydroxy-4′-methoxyflavone), apigenin (5,7,4′-trihydroxyflavone), diosmetin (5,7,3′-trihydroxy-4′-methoxyflavone) and luteolin (5,7,3′,4′-tetrahydroxyflavone).

Taxonomy 
The black locust is a plant from the subfamily of Faboideae in the family of legumes (Fabaceae) and is a relative of the pea and bean.

The black locust is commonly referred to as "false acacia" after its species name "pseudoacacia", although it is not particularly closely related to the acacia, which belongs to the mimosa subfamily (Mimosoideae). Both species are similar in the form of their feathered leaves and thorns, but the flower shapes are very different. Confusion between species of both genera is almost impossible in higher latitudes, since acacias are native to subtropical and tropical areas and do not thrive in the cooler climates favoured by the black locust.

History and naming 
The tree was identified in 1607 at Jamestown by British colonists, who used the timber to build houses. The tree was named for its resemblance to Ceratonia siliqua, known as the "Old World Locust". Jesuit missionaries apparently fancied that this was the tree that supported St. John in the wilderness, but it is native only to North America.

It was introduced into Britain in 1636.

Robinia is a native North American genus, but traces of it are found in the Eocene and Miocene rocks of Europe.

The genus is named after the royal French gardeners Jean Robin and his son Vespasien Robin, who brought the plant to Europe in 1601, in what may be regarded as a reintroduction. A black locust planted by Vespasien Robin still exists in the Square René Viviani in Paris.

Distribution and invasive habit 

The black locust is native to the eastern United States, but the exact native range is not accurately known as the tree has been cultivated and is currently found across the continent, in all the lower 48 states, eastern Canada, and British Columbia. The native range is thought to be two separate populations, one centered about the Appalachian Mountains, from Pennsylvania to northern Georgia, and a second westward focused around the Ozark Plateau and Ouachita Mountains of Arkansas, Oklahoma and Missouri.

Black locust's current range has been expanded by humans distributing the tree for landscaping and now includes Pakistan, India, Australia, Canada, China, Europe, Northern and South Africa, temperate regions in Asia, New Zealand, Southern South America.

Black locust is an interesting example of how one plant species can be considered invasive even on the continent to which it is native. For example, within the western United States, New England region, northern California, and in the Midwest, black locust is considered an invasive species. In the prairie and savanna regions of the Midwest black locust can dominate and shade open habitats. These ecosystems have been decreasing in size, and black locust is contributing to this reduction; when black locust invades an area, it will convert the grassland ecosystem into a forested ecosystem where the grasses are displaced. Black locust has been listed as invasive in Connecticut, Wisconsin, and Michigan, and is prohibited in Massachusetts. 

In Australia black locust has become naturalized within Victoria, New South Wales, South Australia and Western Australia. It is considered an environmental weed there. In South Africa, it is regarded as a weed because of its suckering habit. In Asia, many black locusts, called cihuai (:zh:刺槐), yanghuai (foreign huai :zh:洋槐, against native huai :zh:国槐) or simply "acacias", were planted in Dalian, Liaoning, China, during its Russian and Japanese occupation, and are loved by the local people: there is Acacia Avenue (槐树大道) in downtown; the Acacia Flower Festival (槐花節) is celebrated every year in May; and acacia honey is collected in the suburbs by bee keepers.

Ecology 

When growing in sandy areas this plant can enrich the soil by means of its nitrogen-fixing nodules, allowing other species to move in. On sandy soils black locust may replace other vegetation which cannot fix nitrogen.

Black locust is a typical early successional plant, a pioneer species. It grows best in bright sunlight and does not handle shade well. It specializes in colonizing disturbed areas and edges of woodlots before it is eventually replaced with taller or more shade-tolerant species. It prefers dry to moist limestone soils but will grow on most soils as long as they are not wet or poorly drained.  This tree tolerates a soil pH range of 4.6 to 8.2. Within its native range it will grow on soils of Inceptisols, Ultisols, and Alfisols groups, but does not do well on compacted, clayey or eroded soils. Black locust is a part of the Appalachian mixed mesophytic forests.

Black locust is host to up to 67 species of lepidoptera, and provides valuable cover when planted on previously open areas. Its seeds are eaten by bobwhite quail and other game birds and squirrels. Woodpeckers may nest in the trunk since older trees are often infected by heart rot.

Pests 
Locust leaf miner Odontota dorsalis attacks the tree in spring and turns the leaves brown by mid summer, slowing the growth of the tree though not seriously. Locust borer Megacyllene robiniae larvae carve tunnels into the trunk of the tree and make it more prone to being knocked down by the wind. Heart rot is the only significant disease affecting black locust. Black locust is also attacked by Chlorogenus robiniae, a virus which causes witch's broom growths; clear leaflet veins are a symptom of the disease.

Cultivation 
Black locust is a major honey plant in the eastern US, and has been planted in European countries. In many European countries, it is the source of the renowned acacia honey. Flowering starts after 140 growing degree days. However, its blooming period is short (about 10 days) and it does not consistently produce a honey crop year after year. Weather conditions can have quite an effect on the amount of nectar collected, as well; in Ohio for example, good locust honey flow happens in one of five years.

Black locust can be easily propagated from roots, softwood, or hardwood. Cultivars may be grafted, ensuring that parent and daughter plants will be genetically identical.R. pseudoacacia is considered an excellent plant for growing in highly disturbed areas as an erosion control plant. Black locust's shallow, aggressive roots help hold onto the soil, and nitrogen-fixing bacteria on its root system allow it to grow on poor soils, making it an early colonizer of disturbed areas. Obviating the mass application of fertilizers, black locust and other nitrogen-fixing tree and shrub species have gained importance in managed forestry.

Black locust is planted for firewood, as it grows rapidly, is highly resilient in a variety of soils, and it grows back rapidly after harvest from the existing root system. (see coppicing)

In Europe, it is often planted along streets and in parks, especially in large cities, because it tolerates pollution well.

Cultivars 
Several cultivars exist, 'Frisia' being one of the most planted ones.
'Decaisneana' has been considered a cultivar but is more accurately a hybrid (R. pseudoacacia x R. viscosa). It has light rose-pink colored flowers and small or no prickles.
‘Frisia’, a selection with bright yellow-green leaves and red prickles, is occasionally planted as an ornamental tree.
'Purple robe' has dark rose-pink flowers and bronze red new growth. The flowers tend to last longer than on the wild tree.
'Tortuosa', a small tree with curved and distorted branches.
'Unifoliola', a plant with fewer leaflets, no prickles, and a shorter height.

Toxicity 
The bark, leaves, and wood are toxic to both humans and livestock. Important constituents of the plant are the toxalbumin robin, which loses its toxicity when heated, and robinin, a nontoxic glucoside.

Horses that consume the plant show signs of anorexia, depression, incontinence, colic, weakness, and cardiac arrhythmia. Symptoms usually occur about 1 hour following consumption, and immediate veterinary attention is required.

Uses 
Black locust has been spread and used as a plant for erosion control as it is fast growing and generally a tough tree. The wood, considered the most durable wood in North America, has been very desirable and motivated people to move the tree to areas where it is not native so the wood can be farmed and used.

Wood 

The wood is extremely hard, being one of the hardest woods in Northern America with a Janka hardness test of 1,700 lbf (7,560 N). It is very resistant to rot, and durable, making it prized for furniture, flooring, paneling, fence posts, and small watercraft. Black Locust is a highly durable organic wood product that does not require chemical treatment to preserve its beauty for 50 years or longer. Wet, newly cut planks have an offensive odor which disappears with seasoning.  Black locust is still in use in some rustic handrail systems.  In the Netherlands and some other parts of Europe, black locust is one of the most rot-resistant local trees, and projects have started to limit the use of tropical wood by promoting this tree and creating plantations. Flavonoids in the heartwood allow the wood to last over 100 years in soil.

Black locust is highly valued as firewood for wood-burning stoves; it burns slowly, with little visible flame or smoke, and has a higher heat content than any other species that grows widely in the Eastern United States, comparable to the heat content of anthracite. For best results, it should be seasoned like any other hardwood, but black locust is also popular because of its ability to burn even when wet. In fireplaces, it can be less satisfactory because knots and beetle damage make the wood prone to "spitting" coals for distances of up to several feet. If the black locust is cut, split, and cured while relatively young (within 10 years), thus minimizing beetle damage, "spitting" problems are minimal.

With a light yellowish color and strength, the wood was much used for decorative inlays and banding in furniture in England and France in the 17th and 18th centuries, under the name "acacia" or "Virginia acacia".

In 1900, the value of Robinia pseudoacacia was reported to be practically destroyed in nearly all parts of the United States beyond the mountain forests which are its home by locust borers which riddle the trunk and branches. Were it not for these insects, it would be one of the most valuable timber trees that could be planted in the northern and middle states. Young trees grow quickly and vigorously for a number of years, but soon become stunted and diseased, and rarely live long enough to attain any commercial value.

Food and medicine 
In traditional medicine of India, different parts of R. pseudoacacia are used as laxative, antispasmodic, and diuretic.

In Romania the flowers are sometimes used to produce a sweet and perfumed jam. This means manual harvesting of flowers, eliminating the seeds and boiling the petals with sugar, in certain proportions, to obtain a light sweet and delicate perfume jam.

Although the bark and leaves are toxic, various reports suggest that the seeds and the young pods of the black locust are edible. Shelled seeds are safe to harvest from summer through fall, and are edible both raw and boiled.  Due to the small size of the seeds, shelling them efficiently can prove tedious and difficult. In France, Italy and Romania, R. pseudoacacia flowers are eaten as beignets after being coated in batter and fried in oil; they are also eaten in Japan, largely as tempura.

References

External links

Purdue University
Robinia pseudoacacia images at Forestry Images
Robinia pseudoacacia – US Forest Service Fire Effects Database
 Robinia pseudoacacia - information, genetic conservation units and related resources. European Forest Genetic Resources Programme (EUFORGEN)
" Coach " Tutoring Center 2018, Robinia pseudoacacia

Robinieae
Trees of the Southeastern United States
Trees of Canada
Garden plants of North America
Ornamental trees
Plants used in bonsai
Medicinal plants
Trees of the Northeastern United States
Plants described in 1753
Taxa named by Carl Linnaeus
Trees of the Great Lakes region (North America)